SchedMD LLC is an American software company that is the main developer of the Slurm Workload Manager (or Slurm), an open-source workload management system. SchedMD also provides support, training and consulting services around Slurm.

SchedMD was founded in 2010, specifically to develop and provide services around Slurm. Its corporate headquarters are in Lehi, Utah.

History 

Slurm began development as a collaborative effort  primarily by Lawrence Livermore National Laboratory, Linux NetworX, Hewlett-Packard and Groupe Bull as a Free Software resource manager in 2001. In 2010 Morris Jette and Danny Auble incorporated SchedMD LLC, to develop and market Slurm.

SchedMD provides services to many national labs, universities, corporations and government agencies, including:

Business model 

SchedMD partly operates on a professional open-source business model based on open source code, development within a community, professional quality assurance, and subscription-based customer support.

SchedMD sells subscriptions for support, training and integration services. Customers pay a fixed price for unlimited access to services.

References

External links 

 
 Slurm GitHub repository

2010 establishments in Utah
Research
Free software companies
American companies established in 2010
Software companies of the United States